West Island may refer to:

Australia
West Island, Cocos (Keeling) Islands
West Island (Lacepede Islands)
West Island (South Australia), an island south of the Fleurieu Peninsula
West Island Conservation Park, a protected area in South Australia
West Island Encounter Bay Aquatic Reserve, a protected area in South Australia
West Island, Torres Strait, Queensland

Canada
West Island, unofficial name for part of Montreal

India
West Island (Andaman and Nicobar Islands) a protected wildlife island in the Bay of Bengal among Andaman and Nicobar Islands

New Zealand
West Island, one of the Three Kings Islands, 55 kilometres (34 mi) northwest of Cape Reinga
West Island, a humorous nickname for Australia used in New Zealand

USA
West Island (California), an island on the San Joaquin River that is north of Antioch, California.
West Island, Massachusetts

See also

 
 Island (disambiguation)
 West (disambiguation)